The Spencer family is a fictional family on the American soap opera General Hospital.  The family is created by Douglas Marland and first introduced in 1977 when Bobbie Spencer arrives in Port Charles. Bobbie's brother, Luke arrived a year later in 1978. Supercouple Luke and Laura Spencer are part of this family, known for their romance and many adventures. The Spencer family is characterized as an adventurous bunch, but many in the family have struggled with various types of substance abuse. They are known for their longstanding feud with the Cassadine family. The family is currently represented by: Laura, Bobbie, Carly, Lucas, Michael, Josslyn, Cameron, Jake, Aiden, Rocco, Charlotte, Wiley, Donna, and Amelia. The Spencers are the owners of the Haunted Star yacht, which is a staple establishment in the Port Charles community.

Family members

First generation
 Timothy "Tim" Spencer (Anthony Geary)  The father of Pat, Luke and Bobbie Spencer. He was married to Lena Eckert (Laura Wright). Tim was a dock worker and struggled with alcoholism. He was physically abusive to Lena and his children. After Lena died from a burst appendix, Tim walked out on his children never to be seen or heard from again. It was revealed in 2015 that Lena died in 1963 when Luke accidentally hit her in the head with a bat while he was trying to defend her during a heated argument with Tim. Luke then killed his father in a fit of rage.
 Ruby Spencer Anderson (Norma Connolly)  Ruby is the younger sister of Tim. After Tim and Lena died, Pat sent Luke and Bobbie to Florida to live with Ruby. Ruby raised Luke and Bobbie in Florida, where she worked as a prostitute to support them. In 1979, she came to Port Charles, and got a job at General Hospital. After working at General Hospital for a while, she became the owner of Kelly's Diner. Ruby was surprised when hospital administrator Dan Rooney, who she assumed was involved with nurse Jessie Brewer, asked her out. Dan and Ruby dated for many years, but after many proposals, Ruby gently turned him down, claiming her past made her feel unworthy of him. Ruby dies in her sleep of natural causes in 1999.

Second generation
 Patricia "Pat" Spencer (Dee Wallace)  Tim and Lena's oldest daughter. Only mentioned a few times by Luke and Bobbie, not much is known about her. She later revealed that she never went to Florida with Luke and Bobbie to keep their father and mother's deaths a secret. She had been diagnosed with MS when Luke and Bobbie found her again, and eventually died from the illness. She has one daughter named Valerie, whom she raised as a single mother in Philadelphia.
 Lucas Lorenzo "Luke" Spencer Sr. (Anthony Geary)  Tim and Lena's son, born around 1948. He was characterized as street smart. He moved to Florida after his parents' deaths, and came back to Port Charles in 1978 as a con artist. He then became the owner of various businesses around Port Charles. Luke has three children: Lucky and Lulu Spencer, and Ethan Lovett. He left town in 2015 after Anthony Geary retired.
Barbara Jean "Bobbie" Spencer (Jacklyn Zeman)  Tim and Lena's youngest daughter, born in Port Charles on August 8, 1957. At the age of 14, she began working as a prostitute with her aunt Ruby, who worked in the same profession. Bobbie returned to Port Charles in 1977 working as a nurse and took a job at General Hospital. Bobbie has one biological child, Carly Corinthos, and two adoptive children, B.J. and Lucas Jones.

Third generation
Caroline Leigh "Carly" Corinthos (Laura Wright)  Bobbie's daughter with John Durant, placed for adoption when Bobbie was a teenager. She was raised by adoptive parents, Frank and Virginia Benson, in Florida. Carly arrives in Port Charles in 1996, planning revenge on Bobbie for abandoning her. Carly and Bobbie had a rocky relationship but overtime, they have reconciled. Carly is the co-owner of the Metro Court Hotel. Carly has four children: Michael Corinthos, Morgan Corinthos, Josslyn Jacks, and Donna Corinthos.
Lucas Lorenzo "Lucky" Spencer Jr. (Jonathan Jackson)  Luke's son with Laura Webber. He was born in 1979 and, as a child, lived with his parents on the run from mobster Frank Smith. He took part in many of his parents' adventures. In 1999, he was presumed dead in a fire, but was really being held captive by Helena Cassadine. Helena brainwashed Lucky against his parents, but he later broke free. As an adult, Lucky became a police detective. Lucky has three children: Cameron Spencer, Jake Spencer,  and Aiden Spencer. Lucky left town in 2011 and moved to Ireland.
Barbara Jean "B.J." Jones (Brighton Hertford)  Bobbie's adoptive daughter with Tony Jones, born in 1986. She's the daughter of Tony and Tania Roskov, and was named Barbara Jean in honor of Bobbie, who helped deliver her. Tania was killed soon after she was born, and B.J. was adopted and raised by Bobbie and Tony. B.J. dies in 1994 after a school bus accident left her brain dead. Her heart was donated to her cousin, Maxie Jones, who was suffering from Kawasaki syndrome.
Ethan Lovett (Nathan Parsons)  Luke's son with Holly Sutton, born from an affair between the two. He was raised in Australia by adoptive parents Frank and Carol Lovett, until they died when he was 15. He arrived in Port Charles in 2009 searching for his birth father, who he believed was either Luke or Robert Scorpio. Over time Ethan developed relationships with his family. He worked as a bartender at the Haunted Star before leaving town in 2012.
 Valerie Spencer (Brytni Sarpy)  Pat's daughter, whom she raised as a single mother in Philadelphia. She is first introduced in 2015 when Lulu and Tracy Quartermaine (Jane Elliot) go searching for Pat. Valerie didn't realize her mother had siblings or extended family. Following Pat's death, Valerie moved to Port Charles to be with her new family. Where she worked as PAA at the PCPD before becoming a cadet with the Port Charles Police Academy, and later joining the force.
Lucas Stansbury Jones (Matt Trudeau)  Bobbie's adoptive son with Tony Jones. Lucas is the biological son of Julian Jerome and Cheryl Stansbury. Lucas was initially believed to be the son of Robert Scorpio. Bobbie bought him illegally, but was later forced to give him back to Cheryl. After Cheryl's death, Lucas was adopted by Bobbie and Tony. Lucas works as a doctor at General Hospital. He comes out as gay to his parents, who eventually accept him.
Lesley Lu "Lulu" Spencer (Emme Rylan)  Luke's daughter with Laura Webber, born onscreen August 8, 1994 revised 1988. She was raised by her grandmother, Lesley Webber. As a teen, Lulu was rebellious and acted out against her father for not being present in her life. She got involved with Dillon Quartermaine and became pregnant, but had an abortion. Lulu is the co-owner of the Haunted Star. She is married to Dante Falconeri. Lulu has a son Rocco Falconeri, and a daughter, Charlotte Cassadine.

Fourth generation
Michael Corinthos III (Chad Duell)  Carly's son with A.J. Quartermaine, who was adopted and raised by Sonny Corinthos at a young age. A.J., Sonny, and Carly all battled for custody of Michael when he was young. Michael was shot and left in a coma for a year, and was also kidnapped due to the fighting between his parents. Michael eventually built a relationship with A.J. when he was an adult, but still considers Sonny his father. He has a son, Wiley Quartermaine-Corinthos.
Morgan Stone Corinthos (Bryan Craig)  Carly's son with Sonny Corinthos. He was born onscreen in 2003 and SORASed several times. He was raised by Carly and her ex-husband, Jasper Jacks, primarily due to Carly not wanting the mob to influence Morgan's life. Morgan later believed that his own parents preferred Michael over him, and developed a resentment towards them. He was briefly married to Kiki Jerome. Morgan suffered from bipolar disorder, just like Sonny. He was killed in a car bombing.
Josslyn John Jacks (Eden McCoy)  Carly's daughter with Jasper Jacks, born onscreen November 3, 2009 revised 2003.
Donna Corinthos  Carly's daughter with Sonny Corinthos, born onscreen September 30, 2019.
Cameron Steven Webber (William Lipton)  Lucky's adopted with Elizabeth Webber. He is the biological son of Elizabeth and Zander Smith. Cameron is named after Zander's father, Cameron Lewis, and Elizabeth's brother Steve Webber. Though Lucky never legally adopts Cameron, he is the only father Cameron has ever known.
Jacob Martin “Jake” Webber (Hudson West)  Lucky's legal son with Elizabeth Webber, born onscreen in 2007. He is the biological son of Elizabeth and Jason Morgan, but Lucky is listed as his father. Jake was presumed dead in 2011 after a hit-and-run accident left him brain dead. In July 2015, it was revealed that Jake is alive and was reunited with his family. Jake is now raised by Elizabeth, as Jason is presumed deceased and Lucky left town.
Aiden Spencer (Jason David)  Lucky's only biological son with Elizabeth Webber, born onscreen in 2010. He was originally believed to be the son of Nikolas Cassadine.
Rocco Falconeri (O’Neill Monahan)  Lulu's son with Dante Falconeri, born onscreen in 2013. The child is carried by Dr. Britt Westbourne, who steals Dante and Lulu's embryos and tries to pass the infant off as Patrick Drake's.  When Rocco is born, Britt raises him as her own son. However, the truth comes out, and Rocco is returned to Dante and Lulu. 
Charlotte Cassadine (Scarlett Fernandez)  Lulu's daughter with Valentin Cassadine. The child is carried by Claudette Beaulieu. Charlotte was raised by Valentin and Claudette, until Claudette left with Charlotte, and went on the run for several years. When Claudette leaves Port Charles, Charlotte is left behind, where Valentin finds her. Lulu did not know about Charlotte's existence or her birth.
Wiley Cooper-JonesLucas' adoptive son with Brad Cooper. He was the biological son of Willow Tait and Hank Archer, placed for adoption at birth. He died of SIDS a day after being born. Wiley was switched with Wiley Quartermaine-Corinthos after his death.

Fifth Generation
Wiley Quartermaine-Corinthos Michael's son with Nelle Benson. He was switched with Wiley-Cooper Jones after being born by Nelle and Brad Cooper. The switch was discovered, and Wiley was returned to Michael.

In-Laws
Lena Eckert Spencer (Laura Wright) - Tim's wife (dissolved)   
Laura Webber (Genie Francis) - Luke's wife (1981–2001, 2006)   
Tracy Quartermaine (Jane Elliot) - Luke's wife (2005–10, 2010–11, 2014)   
D.L. Brock (David Groh) - Bobbie's husband (1984–85)   
Jake Meyer (Sam Behrens) - Bobbie's husband (1986–88)   
Anthony "Tony" Jones (Brad Maule) - Bobbie's husband (1989–96)   
Stefan Cassadine (Stephen Nichols - Bobbie's husband (1996–97)   
A. J. Quartermaine (Sean Kanan) - Carly's husband (1999–2000)   
Sonny Corinthos (Maurice Benard) - Carly's husband (2000–01, 2002–05, 2007, 2015–22)   
Lorenzo Alcazar (Ted King) - Carly's husband (2005)   
Jasper "Jax" Jacks (Ingo Rademacher) - Carly's husband (2007–13)   
Elizabeth Webber (Rebecca Herbst) - Lucky's wife (2005–07, 2007)   
Siobhan McKenna (Erin Chambers) - Lucky's wife (2011)   
Dante Falconeri (Dominic Zamprogna) - Lulu's husband (2011–16, 2016–19)   
Lauren Katherine "Kiki" Jerome (Kristen Alderson) - Morgan's wife (2013)  
Bradley "Brad" Cooper (Parry Shen) - Lucas' husband (2016–20)
Nelle Benson (Chloe Lanier) - Michael’s wife (2018)
Willow Tait (Katelyn MacMullen) - Michael's wife (2020–21)

Family tree
Legend

Descendants

 Unnamed man (deceased), married Unnamed woman 
 Timothy "Tim" Spencer, married Lena Eckert (194?–63)
 Pat Spencer (1945–2015) 
Valerie Spencer; Pat's daughter
 Luke Spencer (1948–2021), married Laura Webber (1981–2001, 2006), Tracy Quartermaine (2005–10, 2010–11, 2014) 
 Lucky Spencer (1979–) Luke and Laura's son, married Elizabeth Webber (2005–07, 2007), Siobhan McKenna (2011)
 Cameron Spencer (2003–); Elizabeth's son with Zander Smith; adopted by Lucky 
 Jake Spencer (2007–); Elizabeth's son with Jason Morgan; adopted by Lucky 
 Aiden Spencer (2010–); Lucky and Elizabeth's son
 Ethan Lovett (1987–) Luke's son with Holly Sutton, married Maya Ward (2010–11)
 Lulu Spencer (1988–) Luke and Laura's daughter, married Dante Falconeri (2011–16, 2016–19)
 Rocco Falconeri (2013–); Lulu and Dante's son 
 Charlotte Cassadine (2009–); Lulu's daughter with Valentin Cassadine
 Bobbie Spencer (1957–), married D. L. Brock (1984–85), Jake Meyer (1986–88), Tony Jones (1989–96), Stefan Cassadine (1996–97)
 Carly Benson (1973–), Bobbie's daughter with John Durant, married A. J. Quartermaine (1999–2000), Sonny Corinthos (2000–01, 2001–02, 2002–05, 2007, 2015–22), Lorenzo Alcazar (2005), Jasper Jacks (2007–13)
 Michael Corinthos (1992–), Carly and A.J.'s son, adopted by Sonny, married Nelle Benson (2018), Willow Tait (2020–21)
  Jonah Corinthos (2018–), Michael and Nelle's son
 Morgan Corinthos (1994–2016), Carly and Sonny's son, married Kiki Jerome (2013)
 Josslyn Jacks (2002–), Carly and Jax's daughter
  Donna Corinthos (2019–), Carly and Sonny's daughter
 B. J. Jones (1986–1994), Bobbie's adopted daughter with Tony
 Lucas Jones (1987–), Bobbie and Tony's adopted son, married Brad Cooper (2016–20)
 Wiley Cooper-Jones (2018); Lucas and Brad's adoptive son
 Ruby Spencer (1924–1999); Tim's sister who raised Luke and Bobbie.

References

General Hospital characters
General Hospital families